Ouango is a town located in the Central African Republic prefecture of Mbomou.

Populated places in Mbomou